SCA may refer to:

Biology and health 
 Sickle cell disease, also known as sickle cell anaemia
 Spinocerebellar ataxia, a neurological condition
 Statistical coupling analysis, a method to identify covarying pairs of amino acids in protein multiple sequence alignments
 Sudden cardiac arrest, a condition in which the heart suddenly stops beating, leading to sudden cardiac death
 Superior cerebellar artery, a major blood supplier to the cerebellum

Commercial entities 
 Sebastian Conran Associates, a British product and brand development consultancy
 Sony Corporation of America, holding company for Sony's American companies
 Southern Cross Austereo, an Australian media company
 Supercheap Auto, an Australian automotive parts and accessories retailer
 SCA (company) (Svenska Cellulosa Aktiebolaget), a Swedish hygiene products and paper manufacturer

Computing 
 SCA (computer virus), an Amiga virus referencing the Swiss Cracking Association
 Service Component Architecture
 Side-channel attack, in cryptography
 Single Connector Attachment or Single Connection Attach, an 80-pin SCSI storage interface
 Software Communications Architecture, in Software-Defined Radio (SDR)
 Static code analysis
 Strong customer authentication
 Software Composition Analysis

Locations 
 Seoul Capital Area, Korea
 Singapore Changi Airport
 South and Central America, a country grouping
 Southern Control Area, a Canadian airspace designation
 Soviet Central Asia

Organizations 
 Bureau of South and Central Asian Affairs, in the U.S. Department of State
 Sabah Chinese Association
 Sarawak Chinese Association
 Schuylkill Canal Association, an organization that maintains a section of historical canal in Pennsylvania
 Scottish Canoe Association, the national governing body for paddlesports in Scotland
 Screen Composers of America, an organization co-founded by Jeff Alexander
 Secular Coalition for America
 Sexual Compulsives Anonymous
 Société en commandite par actions, a type of corporation in France
 Society for Creative Anachronism, an international living history group 
SCA armoured combat, a combat sport developed by the above organization
 Society for Cultural Anthropology, a professional association for cultural anthropologists
 Student Catholic Action, a religious student organization in the Philippines
 Student Conservation Association, a non-profit conservation service organization in the United States
 Suez Canal Authority, a state-owned authority which owns and maintains the Suez Canal
 Supreme Council of Antiquities, the Egyptian antiquities service
 Supreme Court of Albania, the court of last resort in the Republic of Albania
 Swedish Committee for Afghanistan
 Swiss Cricket Association
 Sydney Catchment Authority
 Sydney College of the Arts

Other 
 McNamara–O'Hara Service Contract Act
 Senate Constitutional Amendment, the formal name for a type of California ballot proposition
 Shuttle Carrier Aircraft, two Boeing 747 aircraft modified to transport the Space Shuttle
 Small craft advisory
 Solar collector array, a type of solar thermal collector
 Spectrum continuation analysis
 Stored Communications Act, Title II of the US Electronic Communications Privacy Act of 1986
 Subsidiary communications authority, the Federal Communications Commission's name for subcarrier channels transmitted on a broadcast FM station
 Sustainable competitive advantage, a business advantage that is preserved over long term
 USC School of Cinematic Arts, University of Southern California, United States